Progress 18 was a Soviet uncrewed Progress cargo spacecraft, which was launched in October 1983 to resupply the Salyut 7 space station.

Spacecraft
Progress 18 was a Progress 7K-TG spacecraft. The 18th of forty three to be launched, it had the serial number 118. The Progress 7K-TG spacecraft was the first generation Progress, derived from the Soyuz 7K-T and intended for uncrewed logistics missions to space stations in support of the Salyut programme. On some missions the spacecraft were also used to adjust the orbit of the space station.

The spacecraft were powered by chemical batteries, and could operate in free flight for up to three days, remaining docked to the station for up to thirty.

Launch
Progress 18 launched on 20 October 1983 from the Baikonur Cosmodrome in the Kazakh SSR. It used a Soyuz-U rocket.

Docking
Progress 18 docked with the aft port of Salyut 7 on 22 October 1983 at 11:34 UTC, and was undocked on 13 November 1983 at 03:08 UTC.

Decay
It remained in orbit until 16 November 1983, when it was deorbited. The deorbit burn occurred at 04:18 UTC.

See also

 1983 in spaceflight
 List of Progress missions
 List of uncrewed spaceflights to Salyut space stations

References

Progress (spacecraft) missions
1983 in the Soviet Union
Spacecraft launched in 1983
Spacecraft which reentered in 1983
Spacecraft launched by Soyuz-U rockets